Neptis larseni (Príncipe sailer) is a butterfly in the family Nymphalidae. It is found on the island of Príncipe.

References

larseni
Endemic fauna of Príncipe
Invertebrates of São Tomé and Príncipe
Butterflies of Africa
Butterflies described in 1997